The 2022 Central Connecticut Blue Devils football team represented Central Connecticut State University as a member of the Northeast Conference (NEC) during the 2022 NCAA Division I FCS football season. The Blue Devils, led by fourth-year head coach Ryan McCarthy, played their home games at Arute Field.

Previous season

The Blue Devils finished the 2021 season with a record of 4–7, 4–3 NEC play to finish in a tie for fourth place.

Schedule

Game summaries

at UConn

Sacred Heart

at Southeastern Louisiana

at Albany

at Saint Francis (PA)

Brown

Duquesne

Wagner

at LIU

Merrimack

at Stonehill

References

Central Connecticut
Central Connecticut Blue Devils football seasons
Central Connecticut Blue Devils football